Sergio Solli (19 November 1944 – 3 February 2023) was an Italian actor and stage director.

Life and career
Born in Naples, Solli was originally a hairdresser who acted in small amateur dramatics as a hobby, but his career had a turning point in the 1970s after a successful audition with Eduardo De Filippo; he stayed with his stage for numerous years, also appearing in several De Filippo's television works.

Solli was also a theatre director, and worked on stage with the companies of Carlo Giuffrè, Mariano Rigillo, Roberto De Simone, among others. In cinema he had a busy career as a character actor, both in dramatic and comedic roles, and is best remembered for his roles in Luciano De Crescenzo's films.

Solli died on 3 February 2023, at the age of 78.

Selected filmography 
 No Thanks, Coffee Makes Me Nervous (1982)  
 A Joke of Destiny (1983)  
 Petomaniac (1983)  
 Così parlò Bellavista (1984)  
 Il mistero di Bellavista (1985)  
 Stregati (1986)
 'O Re (1988)  
 32 dicembre (1988)  
 Death of a Neapolitan Mathematician  (1992)
 Ciao, Professore! (1992)  
 Il Postino: The Postman (1994)
 A spasso nel tempo – L'avventura continua  (1997)  
 E adesso sesso (2001)  
 Pater Familias (2003)
 Salty Air (2006)
 La seconda volta non si scorda mai (2008)
 Come Undone (2009)
 The Wholly Family (2011)
 Kryptonite! (2011)  
 Piazza Fontana: The Italian Conspiracy  (2011)
 To Rome with Love  (2012)
 I Can Quit Whenever I Want (2014)
 I Can Quit Whenever I Want: Ad Honorem (2017)

References

External links 
 

1944 births
2023 deaths
People from Naples
Italian male film actors
Italian male stage actors
Italian male television actors
20th-century Italian male actors
Italian theatre directors